Dhana jiru  also Dhania Jeera is an Indian spice mix consisting primarily of ground, roasted cumin (jiru) and coriander (dhana) seeds. Some cooks add a variety of other spices such as red chili powder, cassia leaves, cinnamon bark, and black pepper, which makes the mixture somewhat similar to garam masala.

See also
 List of Indian spices

References 

Herb and spice mixtures
Indian cuisine
Indian spices